The National Radio Quiet Zone (NRQZ) is a large area of land in the United States designated as a radio quiet zone, in which radio transmissions are restricted by law to facilitate scientific research and the gathering of military intelligence.

Location 
It straddles the borders of Virginia and West Virginia, and also includes a small part of Maryland. The NRQZ is centered between the Green Bank Observatory in Green Bank, West Virginia, and Sugar Grove Station in Sugar Grove, West Virginia. It includes all land with latitudes between 37° 30′ 0.4″ N and 39° 15′ 0.4″ N, and longitudes between 78° 29′ 59.0″ W and 80° 29′ 59.2″ W.

Restrictions 

Most broadcast transmitters in the central area of the Quiet Zone are required to operate at reduced power and use directional antennas.  This makes cable and satellite all but essential for acceptable television in much of the region.  Restrictions of transmissions are strictest within ten miles (16 km) of the Green Bank and Sugar Grove facilities, where most omnidirectional and high-power transmissions are prohibited.

Not all radio transmissions are prohibited in the Quiet Zone. For example, emergency service (police, fire, and ambulance) radios and CB radios are permitted.  However, large transmitter owners must typically coordinate their operations with the Green Bank Observatory.  The only broadcast radio stations are part of the Allegheny Mountain Radio network, with just one station in the AM band, and several low-power FM broadcast translator stations. Exceptions to restrictions are usually determined on a case-by-case basis, with preference given to public safety concerns, such as remote alarm systems, repeaters for emergency services, and NOAA Weather Radio.

The most severe restrictions to the general public are imposed within a 20-mile (32 km) radius of the Green Bank Observatory. The Observatory polices the area actively for devices emitting excessive electromagnetic radiation such as microwave ovens, Wi-Fi routers and faulty electrical equipment and request citizens discontinue their usage. It does not have enforcement power (although the FCC can impose a fine of $50 on violators), but will work with residents to find solutions.

Cellular telephone use in the central area of the zone is also very restricted.

Zones of protection

The Green Bank Interference Protection Group maintains policies to manage radio-frequency interference (RFI) by dividing into five zones based on available legal instruments.

Zone 1 and Zone 2 are located within the property of the Green Bank Observatory. The entire property is designed as Zone 1 except small portions (such as housing, visitor, and laboratory areas) that are designed as Zone 2. Zone 1, also termed the Radio Astronomy Instrument Zone, restricts intentional radiators only to those are deemed essential. All unintentional radiators must be operated within the  recommendations on protection criteria used for radio astronomical measurements. Gasoline-powered motor vehicles are prohibited in Zone 1 as their spark-ignition engines generate significant radio interference, resulting in the requirement that all vehicles and equipment be diesel-powered. Zone 2, also called Observatory Building Zone, allows intentional radiators licensed by National Radio Quiet Zone, but not other radiators such as Wi-Fi, cordless phones, and other wireless equipment.  Certain types of unintentional radiators are allowed. Digital cameras are prohibited, although film photography is allowed.

Zone 3 and Zone 4 are governed by the Radio Astronomy Zoning Act which is the Chapter 37A of the West Virginia Code. It strictly regulates radio transmitters within  and within  of the Green Bank Observatory, respectively. Within these zones, interference to observations will be identified and documented. The owners of the offending equipment will be visited personally to request cooperation in eliminating the interference. Enforcement is used as a last resort. Enforcement in Zone 4 may be more lenient than the limit set by Chapter 37A.

Zone 5 is the boundary of National Radio Quiet Zone; the National Radio Quiet Zone Administrator at the Green Bank Observatory manages the enforcement policies.

Uses 
The Federal Communications Commission (FCC) created the Quiet Zone in 1958 to protect the radio telescopes at Green Bank and Sugar Grove from harmful interference.  Today, the Green Bank Observatory oversees the Quiet Zone.

The Quiet Zone also protects the antennas and receivers of the U.S. Navy's Information Operations Command (NIOC) at Sugar Grove.  The NIOC is the location of electronic intelligence-gathering systems, and is today said to be a key station in the ECHELON system operated by the National Security Agency (NSA).

The area has also attracted people who believe they suffer from electromagnetic hypersensitivity, though scientific experiments have shown this condition is caused by the nocebo effect rather than electromagnetic waves.

Counties inside the NRQZ

Maryland counties
 Extreme southern Garrett

Virginia counties
See also List of radio stations in Virginia, which includes several AM and FM stations within the zone.
 Western Albemarle
 Alleghany
 Amherst, except for the southern quarter
 Extreme northern Appomattox
 Augusta
 Bath
 Extreme northern Bedford
 Northern Botetourt
 Northwestern Buckingham
 Northern Craig
 Western Greene
 Highland
 Nelson
 Western Page 
 Rockbridge
 Rockingham, except for a small area in the extreme eastern part
 Western Shenandoah

West Virginia counties
See also List of radio stations in West Virginia, which includes several AM and FM stations within the zone.
 Barbour, except for a small area in the north
 Extreme eastern Braxton
 Grant, except for an area in the north
 Eastern Greenbrier
 Southwestern Hampshire
 Hardy
 Southeastern Harrison
 Eastern Lewis
 Extreme southern Mineral
 Northeastern and east central Monroe
 Extreme eastern Nicholas
 Pendleton
 Pocahontas
 Two areas in extreme southwestern and southeastern Preston
 Randolph
 Extreme southern Taylor
 Tucker, except for an area in the extreme northern part
 Upshur
 Central and eastern Webster

Cities inside the NRQZ

Virginia cities
 Buena Vista
 The western half of Charlottesville, including much of the University of Virginia grounds
 Covington
 Harrisonburg
 Lexington
 Staunton
 Waynesboro

West Virginia cities
 Buckhannon
 Elkins
 Weston

Outside
Clarksburg, West Virginia, and Lynchburg, Virginia, are just outside the Quiet Zone.

See also
 Radio interference
 Radio silence
 Cone of Silence, a fictional device from the 1960s American television series Get Smart

References

External links
  - Official website
"The Town Without Wi-Fi"—Washingtonian (January 2015)
"The Town Where Wi-Fi Is Banned: The Green Bank Telescope and the Quiet Zone" - YouTube (October 2016)

United States communications regulation
Communications in West Virginia
Electromagnetic compatibility
Mass media in West Virginia
Radio regulations
1958 establishments in West Virginia